Whitefield railway station may refer to:

 Whitefield railway station (England), a former station in Bury, Greater Manchester, now a Metrolink tram stop
 Whitefield (Bangalore) railway station, in India, on the Bangalore—Chennai route